Koalib Nuba is an ethnic group of the Nuba peoples in the Nuba Mountains of South Kordofan state, in southern Sudan. It numbers more than 150,000 persons.

They speak Koalib of the Kordofanian languages group, in the major Niger–Congo language family.

See also
Index: Nuba peoples

References
Joshua Project

Nuba peoples
Ethnic groups in Sudan